Letovirinae is a subfamily of viruses within the family Coronaviridae, where it is the only subfamily besides the more diverse Orthocoronavirinae (coronaviruses). Letovirinae contains one accepted genus, Alphaletovirus, which contains one accepted subgenus, Milecovirus, which contains one accepted species, Microhyla letovirus 1 (MLeV). This species was discovered in 2018 and is hosted by the ornate chorus frog (Microhyla fissipes). 

Other, as yet unaccepted species in the Letovirinae have been discovered in Pacific salmon (Oncorhynchus), and in Murray River carp (Cyprinus).

References

External links
 

Coronaviridae
Virus subfamilies
Virus genera